A Twist of Sand is a 1968 British adventure film directed by Don Chaffey and starring Richard Johnson, Jeremy Kemp, Honor Blackman and Peter Vaughan based on the novel by Geoffrey Jenkins.

Plot

A former British naval officer now makes his living by smuggling goods around the Mediterranean. After being forced to dump his cargo when nearly caught by the authorities in Malta, he is eager to recoup his losses. When a former colleague appears and tells a wild story about smuggling diamonds out of south-west Africa, he sees his chance to make a lot of money. The diamonds are hidden in a shipwreck buried in the sand dunes of Namibia's Skeleton Coast.

In recurring flashbacks, the captain relives his wartime experiences as the commander of a Royal Navy submarine, sent to South African waters to destroy an experimental U-Boat.

Cast
 Richard Johnson as Geoffrey Peace 
 Honor Blackman as Julie Chambois 
 Jeremy Kemp as Harry Riker 
 Peter Vaughan as Johann 
 Roy Dotrice as David Carland 
 Guy Doleman as Patrol Boat Commander 
 Jack May as Diamond Security Police Inspector Seekert 
 Kenneth Cope as Flag Officer 
 Tony Caunter as Sonarman Elton
 Clifford Evans as Admiral Tringham

Production

Geoffrey Jenkins initially sold the rights for his 1959 novel to filmmaker Nunnally Johnson at 20th Century Fox. Johnson intended to write the script himself and have Robert Mitchum and Deborah Kerr cast in the starring roles. Simon Petersen was the assistant underwater cameraman to Steve Halliday with Les Bowie in SFX

References

External links
 

1968 films
British adventure films
1968 adventure films
1960s English-language films
Films directed by Don Chaffey
Seafaring films
Films set in the Mediterranean Sea
Films based on South African novels
Films set in Namibia
Films shot in Almería
1960s British films